Helsingkrona Nation, formally Helsingborgs-Landskrona Nation, is one of thirteen student nations at Lund University, Sweden. With 4,109 members, it is the largest of the university's nations.

History 
The nation has its origins in one of the university's first nations, Skånska Nationen (named after, and composed of students from Scania) which existed from 1682 to 1833 when it split into five parts, with Helsingkrona being one of them. These four parts are still alive in the form of the Scanian Nations' Joint Committee, which to this day still gives out grants and organizes the quinquennial Gåsafesten ("Goose Fest"). In 1891, the Helsingkrona coat-of-arms, a merging of the coats-of-arms of Helsingborg and Landskrona, was produced and delivered to the Inspektor.

One of the most famous Swedish spexes, Uarda, was written by the two Helsingkronites Hilding Kefas Neander and Ludvig Thet gambla Ramberg in 1908. In 1954, another such spex, Djingis Khan, was written by Hans Alfredson and Patrick Meurling, the latter of whom would become Inspektor of Helsingkrona.

In 1958, Helsingkronagården, the nation's housing complex was inaugurated. Its first building, Huset, was designed by Sten Samuelson and was only five stories tall, since the fire department's ladders could not reach higher at the time. Regulations were changed in the middle of the 1960s and another two floors were added. Tornet, Helsingkrona's 13-floor residential tower was completed in the fall of 2015. The nation is currently building another house under the working name of HB Söder, which will connect to Huset through a shared basement. HB Söder will feature dorm-style accommodation with an added emphasis on communal spaces.

Housing 
Helsingkronagården neighbors the premises of LTH.

The House 

Huset consists of 160 corridor rooms, 21 apartments and 8 rooms with pentries. It also houses a club area and unaffiliated pizzeria on its ground floor.

The Tower 

Tornet has 13 floors with 69 apartments and a conference room with an associated kitchen on its top floor, which has a view of Lund, Malmö, the Öresund Bridge and Copenhagen. On the ground floor, there is a salad bar and a studying room.

Helsingkrona South 
Helsingkrona Söder is a  housing development on the southern part of the nation's property which is currently underway (2022).

Notable members 

 Johan Stenström, literary scholar and professor.
 Gabriel Jönsson, author and poet.
 Gun Hellsvik, politician and former Minister of Justice.
 Hans Alfredson, actor, writer and comedian.

References 

Nations at Lund University
1890 establishments in Sweden
19th-century establishments in Skåne County